Mutěnice may refer to places in the Czech Republic:

Mutěnice (Hodonín District), a municipality and village in the South Moravian Region
Mutěnice (Strakonice District), a municipality and village in the South Bohemian Region